Bruno Mathieu (born 23 March 1958) is a French organist. He studied organ with Jean Langlais, Suzanne Chaisemartin, Jean Guillou, Marie-Claire Alain, and composition with Pierre Lantier, as well as piano with France Clidat and Gisèle Kühn. He is the organist of the Church of Saint-Justin de Levallois-Perret.
 
To date, he has given over six hundred recitals in Canada and throughout Europe. In Paris, he is particularly active at the great organs of Notre-Dame de Paris and the Saint-Sulpice, Saint-Germain-des-Prés, la Madeleine churches. Mathieu teaches organ at the 20th arrondissement of Paris Conservatory.

Mathieu has recorded under the label Festivo, Adda, Naxos, Numérisson. His compositions include a "Te Deum", premiered at Notre-Dame de Paris on 31 December 2000, a "Fantasy for organ", and a small suite for piano.

Compositions 
 "Fantaisie pour orgue" (Delatour France)
 "Te Deum pour orgue" (Delatour France)
 "Petite suite sotte" pour piano (Delatour France)
 "Volute Trinitaire pour orgue" (Delatour France
 "Sourires" pour orgue

Recordings 
 Louis Vierne: Symphonies pour orgue 3 et 6 (Naxos)
 Jean Langlais: Suite Médiévale (Naxos)
 Marcel Dupré: Symphonies
 Olivier Messiaen : La Nativité / Bruno Mathieu : Te Deum (Delatour France numérisson)
 Johann-Sebastian Bach : 6 Sonates en trio (Delatour France numérisson)
 Louis Vierne 2e Symphonie - Marcel Dupré: 3 préludes et fugues op.7 (Delatour France numérisson)

References 

 
1958 births
Living people
Place of birth unknown
French classical organists